= Dhok Mochian =

- Town
- Location within Pakistan
- Coordinates: 33.28°N 73.21°E
- Country: Pakistan
- Province: (Islamabad Capital Territory) Islamabad C.T
- Elevation: 565 m (1,854 ft)
- Time zone: UTC+5 (PST)

Dhok Mochian is a town in the Islamabad Capital Territory of Pakistan. It is located at 33° 28' 30N 73° 21' 40E with an altitude of 565 metres (1856 feet).
